John Dyson Harrowfield (born 19 February 1953) is a former Australian politician.

He was born in Melbourne to Roy Wilmott Harrowfield and Irene Mary Whitworth. He attended state schools and then Melbourne University, where he received a Bachelor of Commerce. He worked as an accountant and as an economics tutor at Melbourne University and the Swinburne and Chisholm Institutes of Technology. A member of the Labor Party, he was president of the Blackburn North branch from 1974 to 1979. In 1982 he was elected to the Victorian Legislative Assembly as the member for Mitcham. He was promoted to the front bench as Minister for Small Business in 1991, becoming Minister for Finance in 1992, but he lost his seat in the election later that year. Since 1992 he has been a public policy researcher and consultant.

References

1953 births
Living people
Members of the Victorian Legislative Assembly
Australian Labor Party members of the Parliament of Victoria
University of Melbourne alumni
Politicians from Melbourne